George Derek Varnals (24 July 1935 – 9 September 2019) was a South African cricketer who played in three Test matches in the 1964–65 season.

Varnals was a right-handed batsman. The South African cricket commentator Charles Fortune described him as "a compact and correct player with a good range of shots that came more of timing than of power". He played South African domestic first-class cricket, for Eastern Province, Transvaal and Natal, between 1955 and 1965. Apart from the 1957–58 season, when he averaged more than 50 runs per innings and made his highest score – 151 not out in Eastern Province's total of 267, when he opened the innings against Border and carried his bat – his record was relatively modest until 1964–65.

Three centuries in the first half of the 1964–65 season, including one for Natal against the touring MCC side, propelled Varnals into the South African cricket team for the first three Tests against England. He batted a long way down the order and, although he showed useful adhesion in helping to avert defeat in the second match, his highest score in six innings was only 23. When he was dropped after the third match, he retired from first-class cricket. His only first-class bowling was in the final overs of his final Test match.

Varnals later moved to Australia to be closer to his children. He died in Sydney in September 2019.

References

External links
 

1935 births
2019 deaths
South Africa Test cricketers
South African cricketers
Eastern Province cricketers
South African Universities cricketers
Gauteng cricketers
KwaZulu-Natal cricketers
Sportspeople from Durban